Patrick Magner (born 25 March 1941) is a former Labour Party politician from Cork in Ireland. A long-serving Labour Party official, he was appointed as a Senator on three occasions.

References

1941 births
Living people
Labour Party (Ireland) senators
Members of the 15th Seanad
Members of the 17th Seanad
Members of the 20th Seanad
People from Cork (city)
Nominated members of Seanad Éireann